The 2016 FIBA Americas Under-18 Championship for Men was an international basketball competition that was held in Valdivia, Chile from July 19–23, 2016. It was the tenth edition of the championship, and was the FIBA Americas qualifying tournament for the 2017 FIBA Under-19 World Championship. Eight national teams from across the Americas, composed of men aged 19 and under, competed in the tournament. The United States won their fourth consecutive gold medal, and eighth overall, in this event by beating Canada in the final, 99–84.

Participating teams 
 North America:
 
 
 Central America/Caribbean:
 
 
 
 South America:
 
 
  (Hosts)

Preliminary round 
The draw was held on 14 April 2016.

All times are local (UTC-4).

Group A

Group B

Classification round 
All times are local (UTC-4).

Classification 5–8

Seventh place game

Fifth place game

Final round 
All times are local (UTC-4).

Semifinals

Third place game

Final

Awards

Final ranking 

* Brazil qualified for the tournament but was suspended by FIBA. A fourth team from FIBA Americas had to be named to take Brazil's place. The draw took place with the fourth FIBA Americas team's identity yet to be named. On 12 May 2017, Argentina was chosen to replace Brazil.

References

External links
FIBA

2016
International basketball competitions hosted by Chile
Youth sport in Chile
2016–17 in South American basketball
2016–17 in North American basketball
2016 in Chilean sport
July 2016 sports events in South America